Stephen Bradley may refer to:

Sports
Steve Bradley (American football) (born 1963), American football quarterback
Stephen Bradley (footballer) (born 1984), Irish football player
Stephen Bradley (equestrian) (born 1962), American international equestrian eventing rider
Steve Bradley (1975–2008), American wrestler
Steven Bradley (Scottish footballer) (born 2002), Scottish football player

Other
Stephen R. Bradley (1754–1830), early American politician
Stephen Bradley (diplomat) (born 1958), British diplomat
Stephen Bradley (bishop) (1909–2003), South African bishop
Stephen Leslie Bradley (c. 1926–1968), Hungarian-Australian kidnapper, murderer of schoolboy Graeme Thorne 
Stephen Bradley (musician) (born 1972), musician with the band No Doubt
Stephen Bradley (film director), director of the 2005 horror film Boy Eats Girl
Steve Bradley (politician), Iowa politician
Stevie Bradley, a contestant in the fifth series of Love Island

See also
Steven Bradbury (disambiguation)